Highwon is a Swedish rap group from Stockholm, Sweden that consists of  Ison, Fille, Aleks, Hoosam and Sabo. The name of the group means animal in Arabic.They were formed in (and are associated with) the Stockholm suburb Bredäng.

Discography

Studio albums
2006: De Misstänkta - Mixtapeten

Mixtapes
2004: Radio 127

Singles & EPs
2002: Beats, Rim & Gendish

See also

Website: http://www.highwon.se/
Swedish hip hop

Hip hop collectives
Swedish hip hop groups